Leonard Charles Rowland (23 June 1925 – May 2014) was an English footballer who played as a left-back. He played in the English football league for Wrexham and Stockport County.

He later played for Winsford United before signing for Mossley in the 1960–61 season.

He also won 6 caps for the England national amateur football team.

References

1925 births
2014 deaths
Mansfield Town F.C. players
Wrexham A.F.C. players
Ashton United F.C. players
Stockport County F.C. players
Winsford United F.C. players
English footballers
Association football defenders
England amateur international footballers
Mossley A.F.C. players